Star Light is a 2020 horror movie from Orama Filmworks and The Butcher Brothers. The film stars Cameron Johnson, Scout Taylor-Compton, Bret Roberts, Rahart Adams, Garrett Westton and Liana Ramirez. Tiffany Shepis has a cameo.

The film is directed by Mitchell Altieri, Lee Cummings and written by Mitchell Altieri, Jamal M. Jennings and Adam Weis.

Filming began in October 2017 in Kentucky, United States.

The film was first shown at the Hollywood Reel Independent Film Festival in February 2020.

Plot
Teenager Dylan (Cameron Johnson) accidentally crashes into a popular singer Bebe A. Love (Scout Taylor-Compton). Dylan and his friends try to help Bebe, but unexplained events and weird people turn a graduation party into hell on Earth.

Production 
The executive producer of the film is Jeffrey Allard, best known for his work on The Texas Chain Saw Massacre.

Reception
It received  approval rating on review aggregator website Rotten Tomatoes, based on  reviews.

References

External links 
 Star Light Preview
 Indie Entertainment, Butcher Brothers, Orama Teaming on ‘Star Light’
IMDB
Trailer

2020 films
American horror films
Films shot in Kentucky
1091 Pictures films
2020s American films